Karl Weber (born 26 February 1936) was a German politician of the Christian Democratic Union (CDU) and former member of the German Bundestag.

Life 
Weber joined the Junge Union and the CDU in 1956. From 1959 to 1965 he was district chairman of the Heidelberg JU, from 1965 to 1970 chairman of the Nordbaden JU and from 1966 deputy chairman of the Baden-Württemberg JU.

From 1969 to 1980 he was a member of the German Bundestag. In 1969 and 1972 Weber was elected via the state list of the CDU Baden-Württemberg, and in 1976 he was able to win the direct mandate in constituency 181 (Heidelberg City). In Parliament he was a member of the Committee on Transport and Postal and Telecommunications Affairs until May 1979.

From 1980 to 1992, Weber was a member of the state parliament of Baden-Württemberg; in the state elections of 1980, 1984 and 1988, he won the direct mandate in constituency 34 (Heidelberg).

Literature

References

1936 births
Members of the Bundestag for Baden-Württemberg
Members of the Bundestag 1976–1980
Members of the Bundestag 1972–1976
Members of the Bundestag 1969–1972
Members of the Bundestag for the Christian Democratic Union of Germany
Members of the Landtag of Baden-Württemberg
Living people